Ričardas Berankis was the defending champion but, no longer competing in junior tennis, did not defend his title.

Grigor Dimitrov won in the final 6–4, 6–3, against Devin Britton.

Seeds

Draw

Finals

Top half

Section 1

Section 2

Bottom half

Section 3

Section 4

External links
Draw

Boys' Singles
US Open, 2008 Boys' Singles